Pamidi is a town in Anantapur district of the Indian state of Andhra Pradesh. It is the mandal headquarters of Pamidi mandal in Anantapur revenue division.

Geography 
It has an average elevation of 284 meters (935 ft).

Demographics 

The total
population constitutes  males,  females, and
 children, in the age group of 0–6 years. The average literacy rate is
68.0%.

References 

Villages in Anantapur district
Mandal headquarters in Anantapur district